Kalash-e Bozorg (also known as Kalāsh) is a village in Mehmandust Rural District, Kuraim District, Nir County, Ardabil Province, Iran. At the 2006 census, its population was 34, in 12 families.

References 

Towns and villages in Nir County